The 1944 Southwestern Pirates football team represented Southwestern University during the 1944 college football season.  The Pirates were coached by Randolph M. Medley, compiled a 7–5 record, and were invited to the 1945 Sun Bowl where they defeated the UNAM Pumas, champions of American football in Mexico.  This was also the first time an American football team had played in a bowl with a team from Mexico, the phenomenon not occurring again until the 2011 Kilimanjaro Bowl

Schedule

References 

Southwestern
Southwestern Pirates football seasons
Sun Bowl champion seasons
Southwestern Pirates football